Symphonic Live is a video and live album by the English progressive rock band Yes, released on DVD and a single CD on 18 June 2002 by Eagle Vision and subsequently on two CDs and on Blu-ray by Eagle Records. The album documents the group's performance at the Heineken Music Hall in Amsterdam on 22 November 2001 during their Yessymphonic Tour, supporting their nineteenth studio album Magnification, which also featured an orchestra. The tour featured Yes performing on stage with an orchestra; Symphonic Live features the European Festival Orchestra conducted by Wilheilm Keitel.

Keyboardist Rick Wakeman was invited by the band to perform at this concert, but this did not happen because of scheduling conflicts. In his place was Tom Brislin.

Reception

Alan Ranta of PopMatters gave Symphonic Live a mixed review, saying that "by the time they recorded this concert in 2001, their age had begun to show" and that "Symphonic Live is a solid set, but it won’t be converting a new generation of fans". In a review for AllMusic, Bret Adams gave the album 3.5 stars out of five and wrote that it "takes some time to settle into a groove, but it eventually does" and that "the sweeping musical twists and turns are simply stunning, and they are skillfully executed by both Yes and the orchestra".

Since the band was playing very well together in the filmed shows, guitarist Steve Howe believes that Symphonic Live is "possibly the best Yes DVD available".

Track listing

DVD

CD (1 disc)

CD (2 disc)

Disc one
"Overture"
"Close To The Edge"
I. "The Solid Time of Change"
II. "Total Mass Retain"
III. "I Get Up, I Get Down"
IV. "Seasons of Man"
"Long Distance Runaround"
"Don't Go"
"In The Presence Of"
I. "Deeper"
II. "Death of Ego"
III. "True Beginner"
IV. "Turn Around and Remember"
"The Gates of Delirium"
"Steve Howe Guitar Solo"
I. Lute Concerto in D, 2nd Movement
II. "Mood for a Day"

Disc two
"Starship Trooper"
I. "Life Seeker"
II. "Disillusion"
III. "Würm"
"Magnification"
"And You and I"
I. "Cord of Life"
II. "Eclipse" (Anderson, Bruford, Squire)
III. "The Preacher, The Teacher"
IV. "Apocalypse"
"Ritual (Nous Sommes du Soleil)"
"I've Seen All Good People"
I. "Your Move"
II. "All Good People"
"Owner of a Lonely Heart"
"Roundabout"

Personnel
Yes
Jon Anderson – vocals, acoustic guitar, percussion
Steve Howe – guitars, lap steel guitar, backing vocals
Chris Squire – bass guitar, backing vocals, harmonica, percussion
Alan White – drums, backing vocals, keyboards

Additional musicians
Tom Brislin – keyboards, backing vocals, percussion
European Festival Orchestra
Wilhelm Keitel – conductor

Production
Perry Joseph – producer
Aubrey Powell – director (concert)
Bob Cesca – cover art and package design
Geoff Kempin – executive producer
Terry Shand – executive producer
Jordan Berliant – co-executive producer
John Gaydon – production executive

Certifications

References

Yes (band) live albums
2009 live albums
Eagle Rock Entertainment live albums
Eagle Rock Entertainment video albums